Full House Tonight is a 2017 Philippine television variety show broadcast by GMA Network. Hosted by Regine Velasquez, it premiered on February 18, 2017 on the network's Sabado Star Power sa Gabi line up replacing Kapuso Movie Night. The show concluded on May 27, 2017 with a total of 14 episodes. It was replaced by Celebrity Bluff in its timeslot.

Cast

Regine Velasquez
Solenn Heussaff
Miguel Tanfelix
Bianca Umali
Joross Gamboa
Kim Idol
Nar Cabico
Tammy Brown
Terry Gian
Boobay
Philip Lazaro
To the Top
One Up

Ratings
According to AGB Nielsen Philippines' Nationwide Urban Television Audience Measurement, the pilot episode of Full House Tonight earned an 11.8% rating. While the final episode scored a 6.7% rating in Nationwide Urban Television Audience Measurement People in television homes.

Accolades

References

External links
 
 

2017 Philippine television series debuts
2017 Philippine television series endings
Filipino-language television shows
GMA Network original programming
Philippine variety television shows